Odurakeran (also, Oduragaran’) is a village and municipality in the Yardymli Rayon of Azerbaijan.  It has a population of 754.

References 

Populated places in Yardimli District